First Presbyterian Church of Pennington is a historic congregation in Pennington, New Jersey that started in 1709.  The current building dates to 1875 after an 1847 Gothic structure burned down the previous year.

See also

National Register of Historic Places listings in Mercer County, New Jersey

References

External links
Official Website

Pennington, New Jersey
Presbyterian churches in New Jersey
Presbyterian Church (USA) churches
Churches in Mercer County, New Jersey
National Register of Historic Places in Mercer County, New Jersey
New Jersey Register of Historic Places